The Islamic Cultural Center of New York is a mosque and an Islamic cultural center in East Harlem, Manhattan, New York City, United States. It is located at 1711 Third Avenue, between East 96th and 97th Streets. The Islamic Cultural Center was the first purpose-built mosque in New York and continues to be one of the city's largest. The mosque's older dwelling in a townhouse at 1 Riverside Drive is still in continual prayer use as a satellite location.

The Islamic Cultural Center of New York is a standing building that is 61 meters wide and 73 meters long. The mosque is located at East 96th Street and 3rd Avenue on Manhattan's Upper East Side. When looking at it, the mosque is rotated 29 degrees towards the streets. The architects did this to portray the Turkish mosque and complete two goals. Those two goals were to stand out from its surroundings, and the mihrab can face Mecca, where it is the direction to pray towards the Kaaba.

Design and history
Plans for a large Islamic center in New York were originally drawn up in the late 1960s. The first cultural center occupied a house at 1 Riverside Drive, at the intersection of Riverside Drive and 72nd Street. The first Islamic Center started functioning on a small scale from a modest townhouse at that address. However, the board of trustees later aspired to build a new larger center in a way suiting its prestigious position in the community, and to be one of the landmarks of New York City. Later, an overall project comprising a mosque, a school, a library, a museum, and a lecture hall, were planned out. After years of delays which included raising funds from Muslim countries, a prolonged process of relocating tenants, and the eventual demolition of the buildings on the site; construction of the Islamic Cultural Center began in October 1984. Construction of the associated mosque began on May 28, 1987, the day which corresponded to the end of Ramadan. The cornerstone of the minaret was laid on September 26, 1988.

Construction was delayed during the Iraqi Invasion of Kuwait and the First Gulf War. The mosque opened on April 15, 1991, for the feast of Eid ul-Fitr. In the end, more than 46 Muslim countries made contributions toward the $17 million construction cost of the mosque.

Today, like most mosques, the mosque at the Islamic Cultural Center of New York is oriented toward Mecca at a heading of 58°. Consequently, the building is rotated 29° from Manhattan's north-south street grid, which in turn is rotated 29° from due north-south. The precise calculation of the direction from New York to Mecca was based on the great circle that produces the shortest distance between the two cities. As with many mosques, the direction of Mecca is marked inside by a niche on the wall, known as the mihrab. Placed in the center of the large room, the mihrab is ornamented with a large design. Additionally, next to the mihrab is the minbar, which is a staircase from which the imam leads prayer.

Islamic Cultural Center of New York Building Design Interior and Exterior 

The site has an edge length of 274 meters. Furthermore, it also includes eight columns and four trusses, where they all intersect, forming a solid framework to contain the building and balance it out. The building also consists of six infill panels containing slabs of pink granite with glass beading placed in front of welded steel tubes. The Islamic Culture Center of New York has two floors that separate the men and women. These two floors consist of each gender's washroom, meeting and administration rooms, and a prayer hall for everyone to use.

The design of the Islamic Culture Center of New York is designed based on a pure cube. Three identical windows are set at a certain angle on the left and right the corner of the buildings, where light can come through it and shine the masjid. The mosque walls are cladding with stone from a quarry located in Stony Creek, Bradford, Connecticut. The central aspect of the building is the dome, where it is three stacked layers of frames and takes the shape of a hemisphere. Another essential part about the crown is that even though the masjid interior and exterior are designed very differently, the mosque's dome is made of copper, such as the Statue of Liberty located in New York.

Islamic Culture Center of New York Representation 
Throughout the 1900s, about 200 mosques existed in New York. None were like The Islamic Culture Center of New York. When this mosque was built, it created a huge turning point for the residing Muslim people living in New York. This turning point was when they represented a considerable aspect of the Muslim population consisting of Turkish, Lebanese, Yemeni, and Pakistani origin. Such an event with a sizable dome and a high minaret has crowned the mosque, where none other mosques were even comparable in the urban presence.

Outreach
Imam Abu-Namous engaged in a series of interfaith dialogues with prominent Muslim leaders and rabbis. Abu-Namous's successor as imam, Mohammed Shamsi Ali, continued the meetings. Due to political differences, Ali was fired from his post in 2011. Ali was replaced with Abdul Razzaq E. Al Amiri.

See also

 List of mosques in the Americas
 Lists of mosques
 List of mosques in the United States 
 Islam in New York City
 Islam in the United States
 Islamic architecture
 Park51, canceled Islamic center in the World Trade Center area

References

Further reading

External links

Islamic Cultural Center of New York at New York Architecture Images
Islamic Cultural Center of New York at Skidmore, Owings and Merrill

Mosques in New York City
Skidmore, Owings & Merrill buildings
Upper East Side
Religious buildings and structures in Manhattan
1991 establishments in New York City
Mosques completed in 1991
Postmodern architecture in New York City